The immunoglobulin domain, also known as the immunoglobulin fold, is a type of protein domain that consists of a 2-layer sandwich of 7-9 antiparallel β-strands arranged in two β-sheets with a Greek key topology, consisting of about 125 amino acids.

The backbone switches repeatedly between the two β-sheets.  Typically, the pattern is (N-terminal β-hairpin in sheet 1)-(β-hairpin in sheet 2)-(β-strand in sheet 1)-(C-terminal β-hairpin in sheet 2).  The cross-overs between sheets form an "X", so that the N- and C-terminal hairpins are facing each other.

Members of the immunoglobulin superfamily are found in hundreds of proteins of different functions. Examples include antibodies, the giant muscle kinase titin, and receptor tyrosine kinases. Immunoglobulin-like domains may be involved in protein–protein and protein–ligand interactions.

Examples 

Human genes encoding proteins containing the immunoglobulin domain include:

 A1BG
 ACAM
 ADAMTSL1
 ADAMTSL3
 AGER
 ALCAM
 AMIGO1
 AMIGO2
 AXL
 BCAM
 BOC
 BSG
 BTLA
 C10orf72
 C20orf102
 CADM1
 CADM3
 CD200
 CD22
 CD276
 CD33
 CD4
 CDON
 CEACAM1
 CEACAM16
 CEACAM20
 CEACAM21
 CEACAM5
 CEACAM6
 CEACAM8
 CHL1
 CILP
 CNTFR
 CNTN1
 CNTN2
 CNTN3
 CNTN4
 CNTN5
 CNTN6
 CSF1R
 DSCAM
 DSCAML1
 EMB
 F11R
 FAIM3
 FCAR
 FCER1A
 FCGR1A
 FCGR2A
 FCGR2B
 FCGR2C
 FCGR3A
 FCGR3B
 FCRH1
 FCRH3
 FCRH4
 FCRL1
 FCRL2
 FCRL3
 FCRL4
 FCRL5
 FCRL6
 FCRLA
 FGFR1
 FGFR2
 FGFR3
 FGFR4
 FGFRL1
 FLT1
 FLT3
 FLT4
 FSTL4
 FSTL5
 GP6
 GPA33
 GPR116
 GPR125
 HEPACAM
 HLA-DMA
 HLA-DMB
 HLA-DQB
 HLA-DQB1
 HMCN1
 HNT
 HSPG2
 HYST2477
 ICAM3
 ICAM5
 IGHA1
 IGHD
 IGHE
 IGSF10
 IGSF11
 IGSF2
 IGSF21
 IGSF3
 IGSF9
 IL11RA
 IL1R1
 IL1R2
 IL1RAPL1
 IL1RAPL2
 IL1RL1
 IL1RL2
 IL6R
 JAM2
 JAM3
 KIR-123FM
 KIR2DL1
 KIR2DL2
 KIR2DL3
 KIR2DL4
 KIR2DL5A
 KIR2DL5B
 KIR2DLX
 KIR2DS1
 KIR2DS2
 KIR2DS3
 KIR2DS4
 KIR2DS5
 KIR3DL1
 KIR3DL2
 KIR3DL3
 KIR3DS1
 KIT
 L1CAM
 LAG3
 LILRA1
 LILRA2
 LILRA3
 LILRA4
 LILRA5
 LILRA6
 LILRB1
 LILRB2
 LILRB3
 LILRB4
 LILRB5
 LILRP2
 LRIG1
 LRIG2
 LRIG3
 LRIT1
 LRRC4
 LSAMP
 MAG
 MALT1
 MCAM
 MDGA1
 MDGA2
 MERTK
 MFAP3
 MIR
 MIR
 MXRA5
 MYBPC3
 MYOM1
 MYOM3
 NCA
 NCAM1
 NCAM2
 NEGR1
 NEO1
 NFASC
 NOPE
 NPHS1
 NPTN
 NRCAM
 NRG1
 NT
 NTRK3
 OBSCN
 OBSL1
 OPCML
 PAPLN
 PDGFRA
 PDGFRB
 PDGFRL
 PECAM1
 PRODH2
 PSG1
 PSG10
 PSG11
 PSG11s'
 PSG2
 PSG3
 PSG4
 PSG5
 PSG6
 PSG7
 PSG8
 PSG9
 PTGFRN
 PTK7
 PTPRD
 PTPRK
 PTPRM
 PTPRS
 PTPsigma
 PUNC
 PVR
 PVRL1
 PVRL2
 PVRL4
 RAGE
 SCN1B
 SDK1
 SDK2
 SEMA3A
 SEMA3B
 SEMA3E
 SEMA3F
 SEMA3G
 SEMA4D
 SIGLEC1
 SIGLEC10
 SIGLEC11
 SIGLEC12
 SIGLEC14
 SIGLEC6
 SIGLEC7
 SIGLEC8
 SIRPG
 THY1
 TIE1
 TMIGD1
 TMIGD2
 TTN
 TYRO3
 UNC5D
 VCAM1
 VSIG1
 VSIG2
 VSIG4
 hEMMPRIN
 kir3d

See also 
 Immunoglobulin superfamily

References

External links 
 SCOP listing of immunoglobulin domains of known structure

Protein domains
Protein folds
Single-pass transmembrane proteins